Jean Robert Raymond Aubry (18 March 1913 – 22 December 1995) was a French gymnast. He competed in eight events at the 1936 Summer Olympics.

References

External links
 

1913 births
1995 deaths
French male artistic gymnasts
Olympic gymnasts of France
Gymnasts at the 1936 Summer Olympics
Sportspeople from Chartres
20th-century French people